The Virgin Formation is a geologic formation in Utah. It preserves fossils dating back to the Triassic period.

Description
The Virgin Formation consists of gray to yellowish gray to greenish gray limestone, occasionally fossiliferous, alternating with greenish yellow to reddish brown to gray shale or siltstone. About 30% of the total section of the formation is limestone.

The formation rests on the "lower red member" of the Moenkopi Group and underlies the Shnabkaib Member of the Moenkopi Group.

The formation is interpreted as having been deposited in a near-shore shallow marine environment.  The lower part shows cyclic sedimentation, while the upper part of the formation to the southeast was deposited in lagoons in an arid climate while marine deposition continued to the north.

Fossils
The formation contains marine fossils, including crinoids, pelecypods, gastropods, worms, crustaceans, and the ammonite Tirolites. These are characteristic of the early Triassic.

History of investigation
The unit was first named as the Virgin limestone member of the Moenkopi Formation in 1922, by Harvey Bassler and John Reeside. The unit was promoted to formation rank (and the Moenkopi Formation to group rank) in southwestern Utah) by S.J. Poborski in 1954.

See also

 List of fossiliferous stratigraphic units in Utah
 Paleontology in Utah

References

See also
 

Triassic geology of Utah